Made in Italy is a 1965 Italian anthology comedy film directed by Nanni Loy.

Cast

Usi e costumi 
 Lando Buzzanca
 Aldo Giuffrè
 Walter Chiari
 Lea Massari
 Claudio Gora
 Marina Berti
 Renzo Marignano

Le donne 
 Virna Lisi
 Giulio Bosetti
 Catherine Spaak
 Fabrizio Moroni
 Mario Meniconi
 Sylva Koscina
 Jean Sorel

Il lavoro 
 Gino Mucci
 Milena Vukotic
 Aldo Fabrizi
 Nino Castelnuovo
 Mario Pisu
 Enzo Liberti

Il cittadino, lo stato, la Chiesa 
 Nino Manfredi
 Carlo Pisacane
 Gigi Reder
 Carlo Taranto
 Ugo Fangareggi
 Enzo Petito

La famiglia 
 Peppino De Filippo
 Tecla Scarano
 Alberto Sordi
 Rossella Falk
 Claudie Lange
 Marcella Rovena
 Anna Magnani
 Andrea Checchi
 Antonio Casagrande
 Franco Balducci

Emigranti 
 Giampiero Albertini
 Aldo Bufi Landi
 Adelmo Di Fraia
 Renato Terra

External links
 

1965 films
1960s Italian-language films
1965 comedy films
Films directed by Nanni Loy
Films scored by Carlo Rustichelli
Italian anthology films
Commedia all'italiana
Films shot in Matera
1960s Italian films